Vyacheslav Nikolayevich Lykho (born 16 January 1967, Mikhnevo, Moscow Oblast) is a retired Russian shot putter who represented the USSR, the Unified Team, and later Russia. He won the bronze medal at the 1992 Olympic Games in Barcelona, Spain. He was stripped of his bronze medal won at the 1990 European Championships in Split due to a doping offence.

International competitions

National titles
Russian Athletics Championships
Shot put: 1992, 1997

See also
List of doping cases in athletics
List of Olympic medalists in athletics (men)
List of 1992 Summer Olympics medal winners
Shot put at the Olympics

References

External links
 

1967 births
Living people
Russian male shot putters
Soviet male shot putters
Olympic male shot putters
Olympic athletes of the Unified Team
Olympic bronze medalists for the Unified Team
Olympic bronze medalists in athletics (track and field)
Athletes (track and field) at the 1992 Summer Olympics
Medalists at the 1992 Summer Olympics
Goodwill Games medalists in athletics
Competitors at the 1990 Goodwill Games
World Athletics Championships athletes for the Soviet Union
World Athletics Championships athletes for Russia
Russian Athletics Championships winners
Russian sportspeople in doping cases
Doping cases in athletics
Sportspeople from Moscow Oblast